Beryozovsky (masculine), Beryozovskaya (feminine), or Beryozovskoye (neuter) may refer to:
Beryozovsky District, name of several districts in the countries of the former Soviet Union
Beryozovsky Urban Okrug, name of several urban okrugs in Russia
Beryozovsky (inhabited locality) (Beryozovskaya, Beryozovskoye), name of several inhabited localities in Russia
Beryozovskaya GRES, a hydropower station in Russia
Beryozovskaya mine, a mine in Kuzbass, Russia; near the town of Beryozovsky
Beryozovskoye, a historical settlement in place of Primorsk, Leningrad Oblast, Russia
Beryozovskoye deposit, a gold deposit in Russia
Beryozovskoye, a joint-stock company which manages the Cretaceous steppes with Caragana natural monument in Russia

See also
Berezovsky